The Trimūrti  (Sanskrit: त्रिमूर्ति , "three forms" or "trinity") are the trinity of supreme divinity in Hinduism, in which the cosmic functions of creation, preservation, and destruction are personified as a triad of deities. Typically, the designations are that of Brahma the creator, Vishnu also known as Jagannath (the lord of universe) the preserver, and Shiva the destroyer. The Om symbol of Hinduism is considered to have an allusion to Trimurti, where the A, U, and M phonemes of the word are considered to indicate creation, preservation and destruction, adding up to represent Brahman. The Tridevi is the trinity of goddess consorts for the Trimurti.

Evolution 

The Puranic period from the 4th to the 12th century CE saw the rise of post-Vedic religion and the evolution of what R. C. Majumdar calls "synthetic Hinduism".

This period had no homogeneity, and included orthodox Brahmanism in the form of remnants of older Vedic faith traditions, along with different sectarian religions, notably Shaivism, Vaishnavism, and Shaktism that were within the orthodox fold yet still formed distinct entities. One of the important traits of this period is a spirit of harmony between orthodox and sectarian forms. Regarding this spirit of reconciliation, R. C. Majumdar says that:

The identification of Brahma, Vishnu, and Shiva as one being is strongly emphasized in the  Purāṇa, wherein 1.6 Brahman is worshipped as Trimurti; 1.9 especially inculcates the unity of the three gods, and 1.26 relates to the same theme. Noting Western interest in the idea of trinity, historian A. L. Basham explains the background of the Trimurti as follows:

There must be some doubt as to whether the Hindu tradition has ever recognized Brahma as the Supreme Deity in the way that Visnu and Siva have been conceived of and worshiped.  The concept of Trimurti is also present in the Maitri Upanishad, where the three gods are explained as three of his supreme forms.

Trimurti temples 

Temples dedicated to various permutations of the Trimurti can be seen as early as the 6th century CE, and there are still some temples today in which the Trimurti are actively worshiped.
 Baroli Trimurti Temple
 Elephanta Caves
 Mithrananthapuram Trimurti Temple
 Prambanan Trimurti Temple
 Savadi Trimurti Temple
 Thripaya Trimurti Temple
 Thirumoorthy hills

Views within Hinduism 

In general it can be said that the trimurti has less of a role in the Hinduism of recent centuries than in ancient India.

Shaivism 

Shaivites hold that, according to Shaiva Agama, Shiva performs five actions – creation, preservation, dissolution, grace, and illusion. Respectively, these first three actions are associated with Shiva as Sadyojata (akin to Brahma), Vamadeva (akin to Vishnu) and Aghora (akin to Rudra). Thus, Brahma, Vishnu and Rudra are not deities different from Shiva, but rather are forms of Shiva. As Brahma/Sadyojata, Shiva creates. As Vishnu/Vamadeva, Shiva preserves. As Rudra/Aghora, he dissolves. This stands in contrast to the idea that Shiva is the "God of destruction". Shiva is the supreme God and performs all actions, of which destruction is only but one. Ergo, the Trimurti is a form of Shiva Himself for Shaivas. Shaivites believe that Lord Shiva is the Supreme, who assumes various critical roles and assumes appropriate names and forms, and also stands transcending all these.
 A prominent visual example of a Shaivism version of the Trimurti is the Trimurti Sadashiva sculpture in the Elephanta Caves on Gharapuri Island.

Vaishnavism 

Despite the fact that the Vishnu Purana describes that Vishnu manifests as Brahma in order to create and as Rudra (Shiva) in order to destroy, Vaishnavism generally does not acknowledge the Trimurti concept; instead, they believe in the avataras of Vishnu like Narasimha, Rama, Krishna, etc. They also believe that Shiva and Brahma are both forms of Vishnu. For example, the Dvaita school holds Vishnu alone to be the Supreme God, with Shiva subordinate, and interprets the Puranas differently. For example, Vijayindra Tîrtha, a Dvaita scholar interprets the 18 puranas differently. He interprets the Vaishnavite puranas as satvic and Shaivite puranas as tamasic and that only satvic puranas are considered to be authoritative. The tradition of Sri Vaishnavism in the south holds that all major deities that are hailed in the Puranas are in fact forms of Vishnu, and that the scriptures are dedicated to him alone.

Shaktism 
The Female-Centric Shaktidharma denomination assigns the eminent roles of the three forms (Trimurti) of Supreme Divinity not to masculine gods but instead to feminine goddesses: Mahasarasvati (Creatrix), Mahalaxmi (Preservatrix), and Mahakali (Destructrix). This feminine version of the Trimurti is called Tridevi ("three goddesses"). The masculine gods (Brahma, Vishnu, Shiva) are then relegated as auxiliary agents of the supreme feminine Tridevi.
In Srimad Devi Bhagwat Purana's 1st book and 4th chapter. Devi addressed Trimurti as follows:

"I am Adi Parashakti. I am the owner of this universe. I am the Absolute Reality. I am dynamic in feminine form and static in masculine form. You have appeared to govern the universe through my energy. You are the masculine form of Absolute Reality, while I am the feminine form of that Reality. I am beyond form, beyond everything, and all the powers of God are contained within me. You must know that I am the Eternal limitless energy.

She then said: Brahma! You will be generator of the universe; the Goddess Sharada (Saraswati) is your consort, she will be recognized as the goddess of wisdom and the primeval sound. Lord Brahma, this goddess will be with you when you create the universe.

She continued: Lord Narayana (Vishnu)! You are formless, yet you take form. I assign you to be the preserver of the universe. You will take different incarnations in order to save this universe's inhabitants. Oh Narayana! You have created Lord Brahma, and Brahma will further create thirty three kinds of gods and goddesses. I am goddess Mahamaya, who has made you reappear from your mystic sleep. Your consort will be goddess Lakshmi. Lord Vishnu, this goddess will be with you when you rule/maintain the universe. When life evolves, you will take the form of Vishnu, the one who will perform the task of observing and preserving this universe.

At Last she instructed: "Oh Lord Rudra Shiv, the Great God, you are the personification of time, which is above all. You will perform the task of destroying and regenerating this universe. When you are formless, time stands still. It is due to my power that you become dynamic and are capable of bringing about the destruction and regeneration of this universe. Mahakali is myself, my full form, whereas Laxmi and Saraswati are just my clones, my partial forms but due to meditation, you will surpass all my forms. It is then that I will incarnate from your left half in my manifested form. This form will be my truest manifested form. Lord Shiva, She will perform the task of destroying evil and will be your consort.''

Smartism 
Smartism is a denomination of Hinduism that places emphasis on a group of five deities rather than just a single deity. The "worship of the five forms" system, which was popularized by the ninth-century philosopher  among orthodox Brahmins of the Smārta tradition, invokes the five deities Shiva, Vishnu, Brahma, Shakti and Surya.  later added Kartikeya to these five, making six total. This reformed system was promoted by  primarily to unite the principal deities of the six major sects on an equal status. The monistic philosophy preached by  made it possible to choose one of these as a preferred principal deity and at the same time worship the other four deities as different forms of the same all-pervading Brahman.

Saura 
The Saura sect that worships Surya as the supreme personality of the godhead and saguna brahman does not accept the Trimurti as they believe Surya is God.  Earlier forms of the Trimurti sometimes included Surya instead of Brahma, Vishnu or Shiva or as a fourth above the Trimurti, of whom the other three are manifestations; Surya is Brahma in the morning, Vishnu in the afternoon and Shiva in the evening. Surya was also a member of the original Vedic Trimurti, which included Varuna and Vayu. Some Sauras worship either Vishnu or Brahma or Shiva as manifestations of Surya, others worship the Trimurti as a manifestation of Surya, and others exclusively worship Surya alone.

See also 
 Ahuric triad
 Dattatreya
 Moirai
 Om
 Three Pure Ones
 Tridevi
 Trikaya
 Trinity
 Triple deities

Citations

General and cited sources

External links 
 

Hindu gods
Hindu philosophical concepts
Names of God in Hinduism
Shiva in art
Triple gods